The Iowa State Patrol (ISP) is the state patrol organization in the state of Iowa. Currently, there are just over 267 officers in the patrol, roughly 183 troopers short of their authorized strength of 455. The State is broken into 16 Districts. Their primary concern is enforcing motor vehicle laws, but they also assist with other incidents. These incidents include riots, prison disturbances, labor related disturbances, and providing security at sporting events. The Iowa State Patrol falls under the jurisdiction of the Iowa Department of Public Safety, which also runs the Iowa Division of Criminal Investigation, also known as DCI.

History
The State Patrol was created in 1935 (as the Iowa Highway Safety Patrol), after an act creating the Patrol was passed by the legislature and signed by the Governor.  Initially the patrol was composed of 50 men. Later that same year, the word Safety was dropped from the name, and the unit became known simply as the Iowa Highway Patrol. In 1972, the word "Patrolman" was replaced with "Trooper", and in 1975, the name had changed again to reflect the change that Iowans felt was needed; the Iowa Highway Patrol became known as the Iowa State Patrol. The change was quickly reflected by the difference in the uniform shoulder patches, and by the wording of the logos on the car doors.

In 1936, Oran H. Pape became the first Iowa State Trooper to die in the line of duty, and was the first member of the Patrol to be murdered in the line of duty. Trooper Pape's murder started the custom of wearing your sidearm on the side opposite of your strong arm. This procedure, called "Cross drawing," would continue with the Patrol until the early 2000s.

In the early days of the Patrol, cars were painted black, with the State Patrol logo on the front doors. In the 1970s, the cars were repainted white, with the logo on the front doors. By the early 1980s, Patrol vehicles had a light tan color with the Iowa State Patrol logo on the sides of the vehicle.  In 1998, the Patrol switched to a black and gold color scheme on their vehicles. Blue warning lights began to appear on vehicles  beginning in 1999, also. The vehicle color scheme change was not particularly well received, however, with some critics feeling that the new color scheme had turned Patrol cars into moving advertisements for the University of Iowa's Hawkeye sports teams.  The Patrol later switched back to the prior color scheme in 2001; however, the 2007 and newer patrol vehicles have been predominantly colored silver or white.  The Patrol has mainly used the Ford Crown Victoria Police Interceptor for a number of years.  Prior to Chevrolet eliminating the model, Caprices were used as well quite extensively.  Recently the Patrol has begun using the Dodge Charger (LX) Police Pursuit Version as well. For a short time, the Patrol also had motorcycle officers until the early 1980s due to the neglect, and later, lack of interest of a motorcycle division within the Patrol. The Patrol also uses several small airplanes for use as air traffic patrol, and to locate suspects fleeing on foot, into the wooded areas, and farm fields of rural Iowa.

Rank

Another symbol of an ISP member's rank is the color of braids they wear on their hat. 
Trooper III: silver braids
Sergeant: silver and black braids
Lieutenant: gold braids

Iowa Capitol Police/District 16
In the year 2000, the Iowa Capitol Police Division was placed into the Iowa State Patrol and became District 16. District 16 maintains a highly visible security presence on the  Capitol Complex in Des Moines and the  Terrace Hill Governor's Residence, the official residence of the governor of Iowa

See also
 List of law enforcement agencies in Iowa
 State police
 State patrol
 Highway patrol

References

External links
 The State of Iowa
 The Iowa State Patrol Web Site

State law enforcement agencies of Iowa
Government agencies established in 1935
1935 establishments in Iowa